Samegrelo-Zemo Svaneti (Georgian: სამეგრელო-ზემო სვანეთი) is a region (Mkhare) in western Georgia with a population of 308,358 (2021) and a surface of . The region has Zugdidi as its administrative center, while Giorgi Guguchia is governor of the region since June 2021. Samegrelo-Zemo Svaneti is compiled of the historical Georgian provinces of Samegrelo (Mingrelia) and Zemo Svaneti (i.e., Upper Svaneti).

Subdivisions
The region has one self governing city (Poti) and 8 municipalities with 143 administrative communities (temi), totalling to 531 populated settlements:
 Eight cities: Abasha, Khobi, Martvili, Poti, Jvari, Zugdidi, Senaki and Tsalenjikha.
 Two dabas: Mestia, Chkhorotsku
 Villages: 521

Geography
Samegrelo-Zemo Svaneti is traversed by two sections of the northeasterly line of equal latitude and longitude. The Samegrelo-Zemo Svaneti Mkhare can be split into two historical regions. Svaneti and Samegrelo. In the northern part of Samegrelo lie the Egrisi mountains. The municipalities of Chkorotskhu, Martvili, and Tsalenjikha are located right next to the Egrisi mountain range in Samegrelo. On the southern side of Samegrelo lies the Kolkheti valley, which is a mostly flat region. The municipalities that lie in the valley are Zugdidi, Khobi, Senaki, Abasha, and the city of Poti. The west side of Samegrelo borders Apkhazeti right on the Enguri river. The other region - Zemo Svaneti is located right on the Northern Caucasus mountains. Its only municipality is the Mestia municipality. Svaneti has the tallest mountain in Georgia, Mt. Shkhara at 5,193 meters, or 17,037 feet.

Demographic

Ethnic groups
According to the Georgian census of 2014, 99.37% of the population is Georgian and 0.35% is Russian. Other ethnic groups living in the region include Ukrainians, Armenians, Abkhazians and Greeks.

Languages
Georgian is spoken by the entire population of the region and by the ethnic minorities like Russians and others.
Mingrelian is a Kartvelian language spoken by the Mingrelians, a sub-group of Georgian people and native to Mingrelia.

Svan is also a Kartvelian language, spoken by the Svans, a sub-group of Georgian people native to Svaneti.

Religion
About 99% of the population identifies as Orthodox Christians. A little minority of Armenian Christians and Roman Catholics also exist.

See also
Administrative divisions of Georgia (country)

References

External links 
Official web-site Samegrelo-Zemo Svaneti

Regions of Georgia (country)